Henry Ker Seymer (1807 – 28 May 1864) was a British Conservative politician.

Seymer was first elected Conservative MP for Dorset, alongside John Floyer, at a by-election in 1846—caused by the resignations of Anthony Ashley-Cooper and Henry Sturt—and held the seat until his death in 1864.

References

External links
 

Conservative Party (UK) MPs for English constituencies
UK MPs 1841–1847
UK MPs 1847–1852
UK MPs 1852–1857
UK MPs 1857–1859
UK MPs 1859–1865
1807 births
1864 deaths